Howard Gould (June 8, 1871 – September 13, 1959) was an American financier and the son of Jay Gould.

Early life
Gould was born in Manhattan on June 8, 1871 to railroad financier Jay Gould (1836–1892) and Helen Day Miller (1838–1889). He was the fourth of six children among siblings George, Edwin, Helen, Anna and Frank.

His paternal grandparents were Mary (née More) Gould and John Burr Gould from Roxbury in Delaware County, New York. His maternal grandparents were Daniel Stratton Miller and Ann Kip (née Bailey) Miller, who were prominent members of New York society.

Gould was educated at Columbia College, where he matriculated with the class of 1894 but did not graduate, according to official records.

Career
On February 24, 1898, Gould purchased a seat on the New York Stock Exchange and maintained an office at 195 Broadway in New York.  By 1955, his seat was the second oldest on the Exchange and he maintained it until his death in 1959.

He served as a director of many railroad, telegraph and financial firms, including the Missouri Pacific Railway Co., Texas and Pacific Railway Co., Kansas and Arkansas Valley Railway, Kansas City Northwestern Railroad Co., Western Union Telegraph Co., International and Great Northern Railroad Co., Manhattan Railway Co., St. Louis, Iron Mountain and Southern Railway Co., Rio Grande Southern Railroad Co., Rio Grande Western Railroad Co., St. Louis Southwestern Railway Co., Western Maryland Railway Co., American Pneumatic Service Co., New York Mail and Newspaper Transportation Co., and the Gold & Stock Telegraph Co.

Yachting
Gould was a competitive yachtsman and owned several vessels.

SV Niagara 
In 1895, Gould commissioned a  sloop named Niagara.  The yacht was designed and built by the Herreshoff Manufacturing Company in Bristol, Rhode Island. He won Lord Dunraven's challenge cup with Niagara.

SY Niagara 
Gould also owned a large steam yacht, also called Niagara, which was built in 1898 by Harlan and Hollingsworth in Wilmington, Delaware. In 1912, he installed a Welte Philharmonic Organ aboard the ship.  On August 10, 1917, the U.S. Navy purchased her and converted her into an armed patrol yacht. She was commissioned in the Tebo's Yacht Basin, Brooklyn, New York, on 16 April 1918, Commander E. B. Larimer in command.

Vamoose 
In 1901 Gould purchased the well-known steam yacht Vamoose.  Built in 1891 by Herreshoff for media magnate William Randolph Hearst, the yacht was well-publicized due to her racing pedigree and a series of high-profile speed trials against other yachts around New York City in the early 1890s.

Personal life
In 1894, Gould was engaged to marry actress Odette Tyler, but both of their families objected, and the engagement was broken.

On October 12, 1898, he was married to Katherine Clemmons (1874–1930). She was an actress whose career had been heavily subsidized by William F. Cody. She filed for a divorce in 1907, which was finalized in 1909 and Howard charged her with infidelity, naming Cody.  In spite of the allegations leveled at his wife in the divorce proceedings, Gould was ordered to pay $36,000 per year in alimony (approximately $ today). It was the largest alimony settlement ordered up to that time. She died in Lynchburg, Virginia in 1930.

In 1937, he married the actress Grete Mosheim in London, having previously been a financier/producer on at least one of her London stage appearances. They divorced in 1947.

Gould died at Doctors Hospital in Manhattan, New York City on September 13, 1959, aged 88.  He was his parents' last surviving son. He was buried in the Gould Mausoleum at Woodlawn Cemetery, Bronx.

Residence 

In 1901, Gould purchased undeveloped land in Sands Point to build a new home for his wife, Katherine Clemmons. After Howard and Katherine separated in 1909, he continued to build the estate, using Hunt & Hunt to design an English Tudor style mansion. The first and second floors measure over 1 and 1/2 acres and the home, which Gould called Hempstead House, was an exact copy of Kilkenny Castle on the banks of the Nore River in Ireland.

Howard moved to Europe in 1917 and sold the estate to Daniel Guggenheim and his family. The estate, which had cost Gould over $1 million, sold for only $600,000, including the furnishing.  In 1971, Nassau County took over a 128‐acre portion of the estate from the Federal Government to be used as a nature preserve. The mansion later underwent a $10,000,000 renovation.

References

External links

1871 births
1959 deaths
Howard Gould
People from Sands Point, New York
American financiers
19th-century American railroad executives
Western Union people
Gilded Age
Burials in the Jay Gould Mausoleum
Columbia College (New York) alumni
Former yacht owners of New York City